Richard Kenneth Finney (10 March 1929 - 7 July 2018) is an English footballer who played as winger for Stockport County and Tranmere Rovers. Finney ended his career with Altrincham, where he was described as "a very likeable character who delights in poaching a goal".

References

1929 births
2018 deaths
Altrincham F.C. players
Association football wingers
English Football League players
English footballers
Footballers from St Helens, Merseyside
St Helens Town A.F.C. players
Stockport County F.C. players
Tranmere Rovers F.C. players